Harpalus puncticeps is a species of ground beetle in the subfamily Harpalinae. It was described by Casey in 1914.

References

puncticeps
Beetles described in 1914